Onuist or Ungus may refer to:

 Óengus I of the Picts (d. 761), king of the Picts 732–761
 Óengus II of the Picts (d. 834), king of the Picts c. 820–834

See also
 Angus (disambiguation)